Bitecta xanthura is a moth of the subfamily Arctiinae. It was described by Rothschild in 1920. It is found in western Sumatra.

References

Lithosiini
Moths described in 1920